Janneke is a Dutch feminine given name, a diminutive short form of Johanna. People with the name include:

Janneke Marlene van Bijsterveldt-Vliegenthart (born 1961), Dutch CDA politician
Janneke Busser Kanis (born 1985), Dutch racing cyclist
Janneke Ensing (born 1986), Dutch racing cyclist
Janneke Jonkman (born 1978), Dutch writer
Janneke Louisa (born 1965), Dutch civil servant and politician
Janneke Raaijmakers (born 1973), Dutch medievalist historian
Janneke Schopman (born 1977), Dutch field hockey player
Janneke Snijder-Hazelhoff (born 1952), Dutch VVD politician
Janneke van Tienen (born 1979), Dutch volleyball player
Janneke Vos (born 1977), Dutch racing cyclist
Fictional
Janneke, protagonist of the children's books series Jip and Janneke

Dutch feminine given names